The Finnish Rural Party (SMP; , FLP) was an agrarian and populist political party in Finland. Starting as a breakaway faction of the Agrarian League in 1959 as the Small Peasants' Party of Finland (Suomen Pientalonpoikien Puolue), the party was identified with the person of Veikko Vennamo, a former Agrarian League Member of Parliament known for his opposition to the politics of President Urho Kekkonen. Vennamo was chairman of the Finnish Rural Party between 1959 and 1979.

Support for the party was at its highest in the 1970s and 1980s, with its share of the votes reaching around 10 percent in some parliamentary elections. In the 1990s, the party fell into financial trouble and was disbanded in 1995 (formally dissolved in 2003). The Finns Party is the successor of the Finnish Rural Party.

History
The founder of the Finnish Rural Party was Veikko Vennamo, leader of a faction in the Agrarian League (which was renamed Centre Party in 1965). The relations of Veikko Vennamo and the Agrarian League's strong man Urho Kekkonen were icy at best, and after Kekkonen was elected president in 1956 Vennamo ran into serious disagreement with the party secretary, Arvo Korsimo, and was excluded from the parliamentary group. As a result, he immediately founded his own party in 1959.

Small Peasants' Party of Finland
Small Peasants' Party of Finland (Suomen Pientalonpoikien Puolue) was established in 1959. The founders of the party were members of the Agrarian League. The leader of the party, Veikko Vennamo, resided as the head of The Department of Housing and Land Reform with relations to the Carelian refugees after the Continuation war. Vennamos skisma with his own party started when V. J. Sukselainen was elected the chairman of the Agrarian League.

Ideologically the split began in December, 1957, when Mr. Paavo Ojalehto from Northern Finland wrote a letter to the board of the members of the Agrarian League claiming, that the party secretary of the Agrarian League, Mr. Arvo Korsimo did not meet the traditional moral values and did not appreciate chastity. The only member supporting Ojalehto's claim was Veikko Vennamo. Vennamo was not allowed to take part in party the parliamentary group of the Agragian League in the parliament of Finland for a set period of time in 1958. Suomen Pientalonpoikien puolue was registered in the end of 1958. The only MP of the party was Veikko Vennamo.

As Johannes Virolainen succeeded Vieno Johannes Sukselainen as the chairman of the Agrarian League and had the name of the Agrarian League changed to Center Party (Keskustapuolue) in 1965 to meet better the needs of the sons and daughters of the farmers, who sought work in the cities, towns and boroughs as an alternative to the emigration to Sweden. The Small Peasants Party of Finland emphasized its position of defending the small peasants agriculture on its behalf.

In 1966 the party was renamed The Rural Party of Finland.

Finnish Rural Party
The Finnish Rural Party started as a protest movement, with support from the unemployed and small farmers. The state-sponsored resettlement of veterans of World War II and evacuees from ceded Karelia into independent small farms provided an independent power base to Vennamo, who was nationally well known, having served as director of the government resettlement agency since the end of the war. Vennamo was the honorary chairman of Asutusliitto, the resettler society, and the society was involved in early campaigning. For the newly founded party, the main carrying force was Vennamo, who was charismatic, a good orator and a skilled negotiator.

The Rural Party won in its best showing with 18 seats in the Finnish parliament (which has 200 seats) in the 1970 election. The party got exactly the same amount of MPs in the next election in 1972, but was soon afterwards split in two as a majority of the parliamentary group, 12 members, resigned to establish a new party called the Finnish People's Unity Party (Suomen Kansan Yhtenäisyyden Puolue, SKYP). The party defectors accused Vennamo of autocratic leadership, while Vennamo accused the defectors of having been bought off with parliamentary party subsidies.

Veikko Vennamo's son, Pekka Vennamo, became the party leader when his father retired in the 1980s. Vennamo Junior had neither the charisma nor the oratorical skills of his father. Other parties noticed this, and the Rural Party was taken into the cabinet in 1983. As a protest movement without a charismatic leader, burdened with ministers participating in unpopular coalitions, the party gradually lost political support.

Agricultural changes proved hard for small farmers, who sold their farms and moved to the cities. The Social Democratic Party was seen as a more credible alternative for the unemployed. Finally, the declining support of the Rural Party forced Vennamo Junior to resign. Some of the party's former MPs joined the Centre Party or retired with Vennamo. The party's last chairman and MP Raimo Vistbacka (the only one elected in 1995) was among the founders of the Finns Party and became that party's first MP and chairman. The Rural Party's last party secretary Timo Soini likewise became the Finns Party's first party secretary. With the Finns Party's electoral success in the 2011 election three former Rural Party MPs returned to the parliament as Finns Party MPs (Anssi Joutsenlahti, Lea Mäkipää, Pentti Kettunen).

It declared bankruptcy in 2003. Four supporters of the Rural Party of Finland, including Timo Soini and Raimo Vistbacka, established the Finns Party. The decision to establish this new party was made in a sauna in the village of Kalmari in the town of Saarijärvi.

Ideology
The party held anti-establishment or anti-elite views, and criticized other politicians and parties, the government, "bureaucrats", international corporations, academics, cultural elites and corruption, while idealizing the ordinary people and small-time entrepreneurs of the countryside. Vennamo attacked, for example, other members of the parliament for over-claiming daily allowances. The party was also anti-communist, and claimed established parties and the political leadership were too subservient to the Soviet Union.

Vennamo was known for inventing and using pejorative terms, such as rötösherrat ("rotten gentlemen"), referring to allegedly corrupt politicians, and teoriaherrat ("theoretical gentlemen"), referring to academics allegedly lacking common sense. A slogan used by the party was Kyllä kansa tietää! ("Yes, the people know!").

The party professed to hold traditional Christian values, and, for example, opposed the decriminalization of homosexuality in 1971. Racism and xenophobia were not visibly part of the party's ideology.

Prominent Ruralists

Chairmen 
Veikko Vennamo (1959–1979)
Pekka Vennamo (1979–1989)
Heikki Riihijärvi (1989–1991)
Tina Mäkelä (1991–1992)
Raimo Vistbacka (1992–1995)

Party Secretaries
Köpi Luoma 1959–1960
Eino Poutiainen 1961–1970
Rainer Lemström 1970–1972 ja 1977–1979
Urpo Leppänen 1972–1977 ja 1979–1984
Aaro Niiranen 1984−1989
Tina Mäkelä 1989–1991
Reijo Rinne 1991−1992
Timo Soini 1992–1995

Deputy Chairpersons
Tauno Lääperi 1959–?
Aarne Jokela 1959–?
Rainer Lemström 1. 1976–1977
Aune Rutonen 2. 1976–1982
Eino Poutiainen 1977–1979
Niilo Salpakari 1980–1982
Leo Lassila 1982–1983
Helvi Koskinen 1982–1985
Kalle Palosaari 1. 1983–1988
Lea Mäkipää 2. 1985–
Timo Soini 1. 1991–1992
Toivo Satomaa 2. 1991–
Marja-Leena Leppänen
Jouko Kröger

Chairpersons of the parliamentary group
J. Juhani Kortesalmi (1979–1983, 1986–1987)
Veikko Vennamo (1983–1986)
Heikki Riihijärvi (1987)
Urpo Leppänen (1987–1988)
Sulo Aittoniemi (1988–1994)
Lea Mäkipää (1994–1995)
Raimo Vistbacka (1995)

Party Congresses

Perustava kokous (founding congress) 9.2.1959 Pieksämäki
1. puoluekokous (party congress) 29.–30.1959 Kiuruvesi
2. puoluekokous 3.–4.9.1960 Joensuu
3. puoluekokous 4.–5.8.1961 Jyväskylä
4. puoluekokous 16.–17.6.1962 Pieksämäki
5. puoluekokous 15.–16.6.1963 Seinäjoki
6. puoluekokous 13.–14.6.1964 Kuopio
7. puoluekokous 12.–13.6.1965 Oulu
8. puoluekokous 13.–14.8.1966 Tampere
ylimääräinen puoluekokous (extraordinary party congress) 29.10.1966 Helsinki
9. puoluekokous 5.–6.8.1967 Helsinki
10. puoluekokous 3.–4.8.1968 Kajaani
11. puoluekokous 16.–17.8.1969 Pori
12. puoluekokous ?.8.1970 Lahti
13. puoluekokous 7.–8.8.1971 Oulu
14. puoluekokous 12.8.1972 Kouvola
15. puoluekokous 4.–5.8.1973 Mikkeli
16. puoluekokous 3.–4.8.1974 Turku

17. puoluekokous 1975 Jyväskylä
18. puoluekokous 7.–8.8.1976 Joensuu
19. puoluekokous 6.–7.8.1977 Oulu
20. puoluekokous 5.–6.8.1978 Tampere
21. puoluekokous 4.–5.8.1979 Pori
22. puoluekokous 1.–3.8.1980 Lahti
23. puoluekokous 7.–9.8.1981 Seinäjoki
24. puoluekokous 6.–8.8.1982 Lappeenranta
25. puoluekokous 5.–7.8.1983 Kuopio
26. puoluekokous 3.–5.8.1984 Turku
27. puoluekokous 2.–4.8.1985 Hyvinkää
28. puoluekokous 8.–10.8.1986 Jyväskylä
29. puoluekokous 7.–9.8.1987 Oulu
30. puoluekokous 5.–7.8.1988 Lahti
33. puoluekokous 4.–5.8.1991 Turku
34. puoluekokous 1.8.1993 Mikkeli
35. puoluekokous 3.–4.7.1994 Oulu

Election results

Parliamentary elections

Local council (municipal) elections

Presidential elections

References

External links 
 The New Radical Right Taking Shape in Finland, Kyösti Pekonen, Pertti Hynynen and Mari Kalliala; accessed 26 March 2011.

1959 establishments in Finland
2003 disestablishments in Finland
Defunct agrarian political parties
Defunct political parties in Finland
History of the Finns Party
Nordic agrarian parties
Political parties disestablished in 2003
Political parties established in 1959
Political schisms